Reesa is a monotypic genus of beetles in the family Dermestidae, the skin beetles. The sole species is Reesa vespulae. This beetle is native to the Nearctic, but today it can be found nearly worldwide; it is easily introduced to new areas.

This beetle can be identified by two reddish bands on its elytra, black setae, and antennae tipped with clubs divided into four segments. Only female individuals have been observed; it is believed to be parthenogenetic.

This species, like several other dermestids, is a museum pest. It feeds on dried animal products such as museum specimens.

References

Dermestidae genera
Monotypic Bostrichiformia genera